Steven James Apke (born August 3, 1965) is a former professional American football linebacker in the National Football League (NFL). He was a "replacement" player whose career spanned three games during the NFL's 1987 player's strike. Steve is the father of current Washington Commanders defensive back and special teamer Troy Apke.

References

External links
NFL.com profile

1965 births
Living people
Players of American football from Cincinnati
American football linebackers
Pittsburgh Steelers players
New York Giants players
Pittsburgh Panthers football players
University of Pittsburgh alumni
National Football League replacement players